The Air Force Cross, post-nominal letters CA (Crux Aeronautica), is a South African military decoration which was instituted by the Republic of South Africa in 1987. It was awarded to members of the South African Air Force for bravery. The decoration was discontinued in 2003, but backdated awards can still be made for acts of bravery during this period.

The South African military
The Union Defence Forces (UDF) were established in 1912 and renamed the South African Defence Force (SADF) in 1958. On 27 April 1994, it was integrated with six other independent forces into the South African National Defence Force (SANDF).

The Air Force Cross
When a new South African set of decorations and medals was instituted on 6 April 1952, to replace most of the British awards which had been used to date, South African equivalents of, amongst others, the British Distinguished Flying Cross (DFC) and Air Force Cross (AFC), were omitted. This omission was only belatedly addressed near the end of the 1966-1989 Border War, when the institution of the Air Force Cross (CA) was proposed.

As proposed, the decoration was intended for award only to air crew, who displayed exceptional courage and leadership during dangerous or critical situations while airborne, where an award for bravery was not suitable, based on the premise that bravery involves knowingly entering mortal danger from a position of relative safety, as opposed to skillfully reacting to an unforeseen situation of mortal danger. The proposed criteria were described in the draft warrant as excellent airmanship or outstanding ingenuity or skill during emergencies or unusual situations in the air.
 One incident which eventually led to the proposed decoration, was an in-flight malfunction in a Canberra B(1) Mk. 12 which disabled the aircraft's control column. In spite of advice from the ground to ditch the aircraft, since the pilot would be unlikely to be able to land it safely, he managed to land it at Air Force Base Waterkloof with minimal damage, while having only trim, rudder and engine power adjustments as controls.
 Another example was a Dakota C-47, which lost its rudder and elevators when struck by a surface-to-air missile, whose commander managed to land safely at Air Force Base Grootfontein by having his passengers, most of them serving General and Flag Officers, move forward and backward in the cabin, as required, to alter the aircraft's centre of gravity.

When the other three Arms of the Service subsequently proposed that an Army Cross (CM), a Navy Cross (CN) and a Medical Service Cross (CC) should be instituted simultaneously, the proposed award criteria of all four crosses were amended to outstanding ingenuity or skill in the utilisation and control of personnel, weaponry or other equipment in dangerous situations and, in the case of the Air Force Cross, not necessarily restricted to flying.

Institution
The Air Force Cross, post-nominal letters CA (Crux Aeronautica), was instituted by the State President in 1987.

Award criteria
The cross was initially awarded for exceptional ingenuity, resourcefulness and skill, and extraordinary leadership, dedication, sense of duty and personal example and courage in mortal danger, in non-combatant situations. After 1993, the Cross was awarded for exceptional courage, leadership, skill, ingenuity or tenacity in dangerous or critical situations. A Bar, instituted in 1993, could be awarded in recognition of further similar displays of courage, leadership, skill, ingenuity or tenacity in danger.

The Air Force Cross was first awarded in 1991, to 27 Puma helicopter pilots and flight engineers who were involved in the rescue operation to airlift passengers and crew from the listing and sinking ship MTS Oceanos, on the Transkei Wild Coast on 4 August 1991.

Order of wear

The position of the Air Force Cross in the official order of precedence was revised three times, to accommodate the institution or addition of new decorations and medals, first upon the integration into the South African National Defence Force on 27 April 1994, again when decorations and medals were belatedly instituted in April 1996 for the two former non-statutory forces, the Azanian People's Liberation Army and Umkhonto we Sizwe, and again when a new series of military decorations and medals was instituted in South Africa on 27 April 2003, but it remained unchanged on all three occasions.

  
Official SANDF order of precedence
 Preceded by the Army Cross (CM).
 Succeeded by the Navy Cross (CN).

Official national order of precedence
 Preceded by the Army Cross (CM).
 Succeeded by the Navy Cross (CN).

Description
Obverse
The Air Force Cross is a pointed cross, struck in silver, to fit in a circle 45 millimetres in diameter, with the South African Air Force emblem in the centre on a light blue roundel, 18 millimetres in diameter.

Reverse
The reverse has the pre-1994 South African Coat of Arms, with the decoration number impressed underneath.

Bar
The bar was struck in silver and has a Protea emblem embossed in the centre. The same bar was used to indicate multiple awards of the Pro Virtute Medal, Army Cross, Air Force Cross, Navy Cross, Medical Service Cross, Southern Cross Medal (1975) and Pro Merito Medal (1975).

Ribbon
The ribbon is 32 millimetres wide and white, with a 12 millimetres wide centre band consisting of a 5 millimetres wide light blue band, a 2 millimetres wide yellow band and a 5 millimetres wide light blue band.

Discontinuation
Conferment of the decoration was discontinued in respect of services performed on or after 27 April 2003.

Recipients
Since inclusion in the table itself is impractical, the actions cited for follow below the table. The list of recipients is not complete.

Actions cited for

References

Military decorations and medals of South Africa
Courage awards
1987 establishments in South Africa
Awards established in 1987